Jbara is a surname. Notable people with the surname include: 

 Dan Jbara (1964–2020), American television and film producer
 Gregory Jbara (born 1961), American actor and singer
 Lotfi Jbara (born 1961), Tunisian footballer and football manager

See also
 Gebara (disambiguation)